Betaria FC was a Malaysian football club, based in Tampin, Negeri Sembilan.

They promoted to Premier League having won the 2011 Malaysia FAM League. In their debut season in Premier League, they placed 10th out of 12 teams. They were to relegate to FAM League after losing 3-0 to Muar Municipal Council FC in their relegation playoff match; this was delayed when MP Muar FC pulled out of the league. A play-off match was set with UiTM FC, the third-placed team in 2012 Malaysia FAM League. Betaria remained in the premier League when they won 3-0.

Their U-23 youth team also made headlines in the 2012 Malaysia President Cup tournament, finishing as runners-up to Perak FA in the final.

Betaria finished last in the 2013 Malaysia Premier League, were to relegate to FAM League, but the club's management decided to withdraw from the 2014 Malaysia FAM League.

Affiliated Clubs
  Negeri Sembilan FA
  Malacca FA

References

External links
 Betaria FC MSL Page
 Betaria FC Soccerway

Football clubs in Malaysia
2003 establishments in Malaysia
Defunct football clubs in Malaysia